Détruire, dit-elle (English, Destroy, She Said) is a 1969 French drama film directed by Marguerite Duras based on her book of the same title.

Cast
 Catherine Sellers - Elisabeth Alione
 Michael Lonsdale - Stein
 Henri Garcin - Max Thor
 Nicole Hiss - Alissa
 Daniel Gélin - Bernard Alione

References

External links
 

1969 films
Films based on works by Marguerite Duras
Films directed by Marguerite Duras
1960s French-language films
1969 drama films
French black-and-white films
French drama films
1960s French films